Kigelia is a genus of flowering plants in the family Bignoniaceae. The genus consists of only one species, Kigelia africana, which occurs throughout tropical Africa.

Etymology 

The genus name comes from the Mozambican Bantu name, kigeli-keia, while the common names sausage tree and cucumber tree refer to the long, sausage-like fruit. Its name in Afrikaans worsboom also means sausage tree, and its Arabic name means "the father of kit-bags".

Description 
The bark is grey and smooth at first, peeling on older trees. The wood is pale brown or yellowish, undifferentiated and not prone to cracking.

Foliage 
The tree is evergreen in regions where rainfall occurs throughout the year, but deciduous where there is a long dry season.

Flowers 
The flowers hang down from branches on long flexible stems ( long). Individual flowers do not hang down but are oriented horizontally.

Fruit 
The fruit pulp is fibrous, containing many seeds.

Species associations 
Some birds are attracted to the flowers and the strong stems of each flower make ideal footholds. Their scent is most notable at night indicating that they are adapted to pollination by bats, which visit them for pollen and nectar. The flowers remain open during the day, and are freely visited by many insect pollinators, particularly large species such as carpenter bees. The fruit are eaten by several species of mammals, including baboons, bushpigs, savannah elephants, giraffes, hippopotamuses, monkeys, and porcupines. The seeds are dispersed in their dung. The seeds are also eaten by brown parrots and brown-headed parrots, and the tree's foliage by elephants and greater kudu (Joffe 2003; del Hoyo et al. 1997). Introduced specimens in Australian parks are very popular with cockatoos.

Cultivation and uses 
The fresh fruit is poisonous to humans and strongly purgative. The fruits are prepared for consumption by drying, roasting, or fermentation (Joffe 2003; McBurney 2004). In Botswana, the timber is used for makoros, yokes and oars.

Extracts of the bark, flower and fruit of Kigelia africana have been increasingly used in skincare products due to the high level of antioxidant and anti-inflammatory constituents.

The hard shell (skin) of the fruit can be hollowed out, cleaned, and made into useful, durable containers of varying sizes.

Around Mount Kenya, especially among the Kikuyu, Embu and the Akamba, the dried fruits are used to make an alcoholic beverage (muratina in Kikuyu, Aembu and kaluvu in Kamba), which is a core component in cultural events in central Kenya. The fruit is harvested, split into two along the grain, before being dried in the sun. The dried fruits are then inserted into a fermentation vessel with older, in-use muratina (prural) to activate and inoculate the new ones with yeast. The more the cultures are used, the more potent they become in converting sugars from sugarcane juice and honey to carbon dioxide and alcohol. The alcoholic drink is usually reserved for special occasions like weddings, dowry and burial ceremonies.

The tree is widely grown as an ornamental tree in tropical regions for its decorative flowers and unusual fruit. Planting sites should be selected carefully, as the falling fruit can cause serious injury to people and damage vehicles parked under the trees.

Gallery

References

Bibliography 
del Hoyo, J., Elliott, A., & Sargatal, J., eds. (1997). Handbook of the Birds of the World 4: 415. Lynx Edicions. 
Huxley, A., ed. (1992). Kigelia. In The New RHS Dictionary of Gardening 2: 735. Macmillan.
Joffe, P. (2003). PlantZAfrica: Kigelia africana.
McBurney, R. (2004). African Wild Harvest. Royal Botanic Gardens, Kew.

External links 

Travel Africa: Sausage Tree.

Bignoniaceae
Bignoniaceae genera
Trees of Africa
Fruits originating in Africa
Plants used in traditional African medicine
Decorative fruits and seeds
Monotypic Lamiales genera